Humberto Bandenay (born September 4, 1994) is a Peruvian mixed martial artist (MMA) who is best known for competing in the Featherweight division in the UFC.

Mixed martial arts career

Early career 
Bandenay started his professional MMA career in 2012 and amassed a record of 13–4 before signing with the UFC.

Ultimate Fighting Championship
Bandenay made his UFC debut on August 5, 2017, against Martín Bravo at UFC Fight Night: Pettis vs. Moreno. He won the fight via knockout in round one. This win earned him the Performance of the Night award.

Bandenay was scheduled to face Steven Peterson on February 18, 2018, at UFC Fight Night 126.
However, due to visa issues, Bandenay was pulled from the bout and replaced by Brandon Davis.

On May 19, 2018, Bandenay faced Gabriel Benítez at UFC Fight Night: Maia vs. Usman. He lost the fight via knockout in round one.

Bandenay faced Austin Arnett on November 17, 2018, at UFC Fight Night 140. He lost the fight via unanimous decision.

Bandenay faced Luiz Eduardo Garagorri on August 10, 2019, at UFC on ESPN+ 14. He lost the fight via unanimous decision. Bandenay was released by the UFC in October 2019.

Post-UFC career
After his release from the UFC, Bandenay returned to the Fusion FC. He faced Bruno Conti at Fusion FC 41 on November 13, 2019, winning the bout via technical knockout in the second round.

Copa Combate 2019
On December 16, 2019, news surfaced that Bandenay would be joining Combate Americas' eight-man lightweight tournament that took place on December 20, 2019. In the quarterfinals, Bandenay faced Hugo Prada in a one-round bout. Bandenay won the fight via unanimous decision and advanced to the semifinals.

In the semifinals, Bandenay faced Jose Luis Verdugo. Bandenay knocked Verdugo down in the second round and finished the bout via technical knockout by way of ground-and-pound, advancing to the final.

In the final Bandenay faced Erick Gonzalez. Bandenay won the back-and-forth fight via unanimous decision, claiming the Copa Combate tournament prize of $100,000.

Title shot
The Copa Combate tournament win aligned Bandenay to challenge Rafa García for the Combate Americas' Lightweight title. The bout took place on February 21, 2020. Bandenay lost the fight via unanimous decision.

Mixed martial arts record

|-
|Win
|align=center|20–8 (1)
|Daniel Bastidas
|Submission (rear-naked choke)
|WCC 05
|
|align=center|2
|align=center|2:07
|Lima, Peru
|
|-
|Win
|align=center|19–8 (1)
|Lian Pantaleon
|Decision (unanimous)
|WCC 04
|
|align=center|3
|align=center|5:00
|Chiclayo, Peru
|
|-
|Loss
|align=center|18–8 (1)
|Rafa García
|Decision (unanimous)
|Combate 55: Mexicali
|
|align=center|3
|align=center|5:00
|Mexicali, Mexico
|
|-
|Win
|align=center|18–7 (1)
|Erick Gonzalez
|Decision (unanimous)
|rowspan=3|Combate 53: Copa Combate 2019
|rowspan=3|
|align=center|3
|align=center|5:00
|rowspan=3|Lima, Peru
|
|-
|Win
|align=center|17–7 (1)
|Jose Luis Verdugo
|TKO (punches)
|align=center|2
|align=center|1:14
|
|-
|Win
|align=center|16–7 (1)
|Hugo Prada
|Decision (unanimous)
|align=center|1
|align=center|5:00
|
|-
|Win
|align=center|15–7 (1)
|Bruno Conti
|TKO (punches)
|Fusion Fighting Championship 41
|
|align=center|2
|align=center|3:59
|Lima, Peru
|
|-
|Loss
|align=center|14–7 (1)
|Luiz Eduardo Garagorri 
|Decision (unanimous)
|UFC Fight Night: Shevchenko vs. Carmouche 2 
|
|align=center|3
|align=center|5:00
|Montevideo, Uruguay
|
|-
|Loss
|align=center|14–6 (1)
|Austin Arnett
|Decision (unanimous)
|UFC Fight Night: Magny vs. Ponzinibbio
|
|align=center|3
|align=center|5:00
|Buenos Aires, Argentina
|
|-
|Loss
|align=center|14–5 (1)
|Gabriel Benítez
|KO (slam)
|UFC Fight Night: Maia vs. Usman
|
|align=center|1
|align=center|0:39
|Santiago, Chile
|
|-
|Win
|align=center|14–4 (1)
|Martín Bravo
|KO (knee)
|UFC Fight Night: Pettis vs. Moreno
|
|align=center|1
|align=center|0:25
|Mexico City, Mexico
|
|-
|Win
|align=center|13–4 (1)
|Salim Mukhidinov
|Submission (armbar)
|KOTC: Groundbreaking
|
|align=center|1
|align=center|2:40
|San Jacinto, United States
|
|-
|Win
|align=center|12–4 (1)
|Vicente Vargas
|Submission (rear-naked choke)
|Fusion Fighting Championship 25
|
|align=center|3
|align=center|2:40
|Lima, Peru
|
|-
|Win
|align=center|11–4 (1)
|Alonso Santos Verona Ganoza
|Submission (armbar)
|Redemption Fighters  2
|
|align=center|1
|align=center|4:42
|Lima, Peru
|
|-
|Win
|align=center|10–4 (1)
|Henry Moya
|TKO (doctor stoppage)
|Fusion Fighting Championship 21
|
|align=center|2
|align=center|2:6
|Lima, Peru
|
|-
|Win
|align=center|9–4 (1)
|Sergio Hortig
|KO (head kick)
|Fusion Fighting Championship 20
|
|align=center|2
|align=center|0:28
|Lima, Peru
|
|-
|Loss
|align=center|8–4 (1)
|Arturo Chavez
|Submission (rear-naked choke)
|Fusion Fighting Championship 19
|
|align=center|2
|align=center|2:41
|Lima, Peru
|
|-
|Win
|align=center|8–3 (1)
|Jose Zarauz
|TKO (punches)
|Fusion Fighting Championship 18
|
|align=center|1
|align=center|2:24
|Lima, Peru
|
|-
|Loss
|align=center|7–3 (1)
|Alonso Santos Verona Ganoza
|Submission (choke)
|Fusion Fighting Championship 16
|
|align=center|1
|align=center|4:50
|Lima, Peru
|
|-
|Win
|align=center|7–2 (1)
|Luis Marlon Gonzales Campos
|Decision (split)
|Fusion Fighting Championship 15
|
|align=center|3
|align=center|5:00
|Lima, Peru
|
|-
|NC
|align=center|6–2 (1)
|Luis Marlon Gonzales Campos
|No Contest
|Fusion Fighting Championship 13
|
|align=center|3
|align=center|N/A
|Lima, Peru
|
|-
|Win
|align=center|6–2
|Manuel Meza
|Submission (triangle choke)
|Trujillo Fighting Championship 2
|
|align=center|3
|align=center|4:24
|Trujillo, Peru
|
|-
|Win
|align=center|5–2
|Alonso Santos Verona Ganoza
|Submission (rear-naked choke)
|Fusion FC 11
|
|align=center|1
|align=center|NA
|Lima, Peru
|
|-
|Win
|align=center|4–2
|Jesus Pinedo
|Decision (split)
|Inka FC 26
|
|align=center|3
|align=center|5:00
|Lima, Peru
|
|-
|Loss
|align=center|3–2
|Enrique Barzola
| Submission (rear-naked choke)
| Inka FC 25
| 
| align=center| 2
| align=center| N/A
| Lima, Peru
|
|-
|Loss
|align=center|3–1
|Bruno Pereira da Silva
|Submission (heel hook)
|Inka FC 24
|
|align=center|1
|align=center|1:30
|Lima, Peru
|
|-
|Win
|align=center|3–0
|Juan Manuel Inurritegui
|Decision (unanimous)
|Inka FC 22
|
|align=center|3
|align=center|5:00
|Lima, Peru
|
|-
|Win
|align=center|2–0
|Luis Chang
|TKO (punches)
|300 Sparta - MMA
|
|align=center|1
|align=center|0:00
|Lima, Peru
|
|-
|Win
|align=center|1–0
|Renzo Mendez
|Submission (triangle choke)
|Inka 20
|
|align=center|1
|align=center|0:00
|Lima, Peru
|
|-

See also
List of male mixed martial artists

References

External links
 
 

Living people
1994 births
Featherweight mixed martial artists
Peruvian male mixed martial artists
Ultimate Fighting Championship male fighters